The 17th Satellite Awards is an award ceremony honoring the year's outstanding performers, films, television shows, home videos and interactive media, presented by the International Press Academy at the Hyatt Regency Century Plaza in Century City, Los Angeles.

The nominations were announced on December 3, 2012. The winners were announced on December 16, 2012.

The film Silver Linings Playbook won the most film awards with five, including Best Film and Best Director (David O. Russell). On the television side, The Big Bang Theory and Homeland won the most awards, with each winning three.

Special achievement awards
Auteur Award (for singular vision and unique artistic control over the elements of production) – Paul Williams

Humanitarian Award (for making a difference in the lives of those in the artistic community and beyond) – Benh Zeitlin (Beasts of the Southern Wild)

Mary Pickford Award (for outstanding contribution to the entertainment industry) – Terence Stamp

Nikola Tesla Award (for visionary achievement in filmmaking technology) – Walter Murch

Honorary Satellite Award – Bruce Davison and Brian Edwards

Newcomer Award – Quvenzhané Wallis (Beasts of the Southern Wild)

Motion picture winners and nominees

Winners are listed first and highlighted in bold.

Television winners and nominees

Winners are listed first and highlighted in bold.

{| class=wikitable style="width="100%"
|-
! style="background:#EEDD82;" | Best Drama Series
! style="background:#EEDD82;" | Best Comedy or Musical Series
|-
| valign="top" |
Homeland – Showtime Breaking Bad – AMC
 Downton Abbey – PBS
 Game of Thrones – HBO
 The Good Wife – CBS
 Justified – FX
 The Newsroom – HBO
 Nashville – ABC
| valign="top" |The Big Bang Theory – CBS Community – NBC
 Girls – HBO
 Happy Endings – ABC
 Modern Family – ABC
 The Office – NBC
 Parks and Recreation – NBC
 Up All Night – NBC
|-
! style="background:#EEDD82;" | Best Miniseries or Television Film
! style="background:#EEDD82;" | Best Genre Series
|-
| valign="top" |Hatfields & McCoys – History Birdsong – PBS
 The Crimson Petal and the White – BBC America
 Game Change – HBO
 Hemingway & Gellhorn – HBO
 Luther – BBC America
 Sherlock – PBS
 Wallander – PBS
| valign="top" |The Walking Dead – AMC American Horror Story: Asylum – FX
 Arrow – The CW
 Fringe – Fox
 Grimm – NBC
 Once Upon a Time – ABC
 Revolution – NBC
 Supernatural – The CW
|-
! style="background:#EEDD82;" | Best Actor in a Drama Series
! style="background:#EEDD82;" | Best Actress in a Drama Series
|-
| valign="top" |Damian Lewis – Homeland as Nicholas Brody Bryan Cranston – Breaking Bad as Walter White
 Jeff Daniels – The Newsroom as Will McAvoy
 Jon Hamm – Mad Men as Don Draper
 Jonny Lee Miller – Elementary as Sherlock Holmes
 Timothy Olyphant – Justified as Raylan Givens
| valign="top" |Claire Danes – Homeland as Carrie Mathison Connie Britton – Nashville as Rayna Jaymes
 Michelle Dockery – Downton Abbey as Lady Mary Crawley
 Julianna Margulies – The Good Wife as Alicia Florrick
 Hayden Panettiere – Nashville as Juliette Barnes
 Chloë Sevigny – Hit & Miss as Mia
|-
! style="background:#EEDD82;" | Best Actor in a Comedy or Musical Series
! style="background:#EEDD82;" | Best Actress in a Comedy or Musical Series
|-
| valign="top" |Johnny Galecki – The Big Bang Theory as Dr. Leonard Hofstadter Will Arnett – Up All Night as Chris Brinkley
 Don Cheadle – House of Lies as Marty Kaan
 Louis C.K. – Louie as Louie
 Joel McHale – Community as Jeff Winger
 Jim Parsons – The Big Bang Theory as Dr. Sheldon Cooper
| valign="top" |Kaley Cuoco – The Big Bang Theory as Penny Christina Applegate – Up All Night as Reagan Brinkley
 Laura Dern – Enlightened as Amy Jellicoe
 Lena Dunham – Girls as Hannah Horvath
 Julia Louis-Dreyfus – Veep as Vice President Selina Meyer
 Amy Poehler – Parks and Recreation as Leslie Knope
|-
! style="background:#EEDD82;" | Best Actor in a Miniseries or Television Film
! style="background:#EEDD82;" | Best Actress in a Miniseries or Television Film
|-
| valign="top" |Benedict Cumberbatch – Sherlock as Sherlock Holmes Kenneth Branagh – Wallander as Kurt Wallander
 Kevin Costner – Hatfields & McCoys as Devil Anse Hatfield
 Idris Elba – Luther as John Luther
 Woody Harrelson – Game Change as Steve Schmidt
 Clive Owen – Hemingway & Gellhorn as Ernest Hemingway
| valign="top" |Julianne Moore – Game Change as Sarah Palin Gillian Anderson – Great Expectations as Miss Havisham
 Romola Garai – The Crimson Petal and the White as Sugar
 Nicole Kidman – Hemingway & Gellhorn as Martha Gellhorn
 Sienna Miller – The Girl as Tippi Hedren
 Sigourney Weaver – Political Animals as Elaine Barrish
|-
! style="background:#EEDD82;" | Best Supporting Actor in a Series, Miniseries, or Television Film
! style="background:#EEDD82;" | Best Supporting Actress in a Series, Miniseries, or Television Film
|-
| valign="top" |Neal McDonough – Justified as Robert Quarles Powers Boothe – Nashville as Lamar Wyatt
 Jim Carter – Downton Abbey as Charles Carson
 Peter Dinklage – Game of Thrones as Tyrion Lannister
 Giancarlo Esposito – Breaking Bad as Gus Fring
 Evan Peters – American Horror Story: Asylum as Kit Walker
| valign="top" |Maggie Smith – Downton Abbey as Violet Crawley, Dowager Countess of Grantham Mayim Bialik – The Big Bang Theory as Dr. Amy Farrah Fowler
 Christina Hendricks – Mad Men as Joan Harris
 Sarah Paulson – Game Change as Nicolle Wallace
 Maya Rudolph – Up All Night as Ava Alexander
 Mare Winningham – Hatfields & McCoys as Sally McCoy
|-
! colspan="2" style="background:#EEDD82;" | Best Ensemble – Television
|-
| colspan="2" valign="top" |The Walking Dead (AMC) – Sarah Wayne Callies, Lauren Cohan, Danai Gurira, Laurie Holden, Andrew Lincoln, Melissa McBride, David Morrissey, Norman Reedus, Chandler Riggs, Michael Rooker, Scott Wilson, and Steven Yeun|}

New Media winners and nominees
{| class=wikitable style="width="100%"
|-
! style="background:#EEDD82;" | Best Action / Adventure Game
! style="background:#EEDD82;" | Best Mobile Game
|-
| valign="top" |Dishonored (Arkane Studios) Assassin's Creed III (Ubisoft)
 Binary Domain (Yakuza Studio)
 Minecraft: Xbox 360 Edition (4J Studios / Mojang Studios)
 The Walking Dead (Episode: "No Time Left") (Telltale Games)
| valign="top" |Super Monsters Ate My Condo (Adult Swim Digital) Amazing Alex (Rovio Entertainment)
 Horn (Phosphor Games)
 Huebrix (Yellow Monkey Studios)
 Wildblood (Gameloft)
|-
! style="background:#EEDD82;" | Best Role Playing Game
! style="background:#EEDD82;" | Best Sports / Racing Game
|-
| valign="top" |Mass Effect 3 (BioWare) Dark Souls (FromSoftware)
 Diablo III (Blizzard Entertainment)
 The Elder Scrolls V: Dawnguard (Bethesda Game Studios)
 Kingdoms of Amalur: Reckoning (38 Studios)
| valign="top" |Forza Horizon (Playground Games) FIFA 13 (EA Sports)
 LittleBigPlanet Karting (United Front Games)
 Madden NFL 13 (EA Tiburon)
 Pro Evolution Soccer 2013 (Konami)
|}

Awards breakdown

Film
Winners:5 / 7 Silver Linings Playbook: Best Actor / Best Actress / Best Director / Best Film / Best Film Editing
4 / 11 Les Miserábles: Best Ensemble – Motion Picture / Best Original Song / Best Sound (Editing and Mixing) / Best Supporting Actress
2 / 5 Life of Pi: Best Adapted Screenplay / Best Cinematography
1 / 1 Chasing Ice: Best Documentary Film
1 / 1 Rise of the Guardians: Best Animated or Mixed Media Film
1 / 3 The Intouchables: Best Foreign Language Film
1 / 3 Pietà: Best Foreign Language Film
1 / 3 A Royal Affair: Best Costume Design
1 / 4 Argo: Best Original Score
1 / 5 Zero Dark Thirty: Best Original Screenplay
1 / 6 Flight: Best Visual Effects
1 / 7 Skyfall: Best Supporting Actor
1 / 8 Lincoln: Best Art Direction and Production Design

Losers:
0 / 7 The Master
0 / 6 Anna Karenina, The Sessions
0 / 3 Beasts of the Southern Wild, Cloud Atlas
0 / 2 Amour, Brave, The Dark Knight Rises, Kon-Tiki, Madagascar 3: Europe's Most Wanted, Moonrise Kingdom, Our Children, Prometheus, Snow White and the Huntsman

Television
Winners:
3 / 3 Homeland: Best Actor & Actress in a Drama Series / Best Drama Series
3 / 5 The Big Bang Theory: Best Actor & Actress in a Comedy or Musical Series / Best Comedy or Musical Series
2 / 2 The Walking Dead: Best Ensemble – Television / Best Genre Series
1 / 2 Sherlock: Best Actor in a Miniseries or Television Film
1 / 3 Hatfields & McCoys: Best Miniseries or Television Film
1 / 3 Justified: Best Supporting Actor in a Series, Miniseries or Television Film
1 / 4 Downton Abbey: Best Supporting Actress in a Series, Miniseries or Television Film
1 / 4 Game Change: Best Actress in a Miniseries or Television Film

Losers:
0 / 4 Nashville, Up All Night
0 / 3 Breaking Bad, Hemingway & Gellhorn
0 / 2 American Horror Story: Asylum, Community, The Crimson Petal and the White, Game of Thrones, Girls, The Good Wife, Luther, Mad Men, The Newsroom, Parks and Recreation, Wallander

References

External links
 International Press Academy website

Satellite Awards ceremonies
2012 film awards
2012 television awards
2012 video game awards
2012 awards in the United States